The Tennessee Titans, previously known as the Houston Oilers, are a professional American football team based in Nashville, Tennessee. They are a member of the South division of the American Football Conference (AFC) in the National Football League (NFL). The Tennessee Titans have had 18 head coaches in its franchise history. As the Houston Oilers based in Houston, Texas, the team began playing in 1960 as a charter member of the American Football League (AFL). The Oilers won two AFL championships before joining the NFL as part of the AFL-NFL merger. The team relocated to Tennessee in 1997 and played in Memphis for one season before moving to Nashville. For two seasons, the team was known as the Tennessee Oilers before changing its name to the Titans in 1999.

Head coach Jeff Fisher led the Titans to their only Super Bowl appearance in Super Bowl XXXIV following the 1999 season. He continued his success with playoff appearances in 2000, 2002, and 2003. His coaching career began to decline and, from 2004–2010, his only playoff appearances included 2007 and 2008. In January 2011, it was announced that Fisher and the Titans had mutually parted ways. Fisher's tenure at head coach from 1994–2010 included six playoff appearances, one AFC Championship appearance, and one Super Bowl appearance. 

Following Fisher, the Titans promoted former player and longtime offensive line coach Mike Munchak to head coach. He missed the playoffs from 2011–2013 before being fired in January 2014. Ken Whisenhunt became head coach shortly after, and tied a franchise worst 2–14 record in 2014. Mike Mularkey, who was originally hired as tight ends coach in 2014 and promoted to assistant head coach in 2015, replaced Whisenhunt on an interim basis after a 1–6 start in 2015. Mularkey was retained as head coach and led the Titans to two 9–7 seasons, including a playoff appearance in 2017. 

Mularkey and the Titans agreed to part ways in January 2018. Former NFL player and coach, Mike Vrabel, was hired as head coach soon after. In his first four seasons, Vrabel led the Titans to an AFC Championship appearance in 2019, back-to-back AFC South division titles in 2020 and 2021, and earned the #1 seed for the AFC in the 2021–22 NFL playoffs. For his team's performance in 2021, Vrabel was named that season's NFL Coach of the Year.

Key

Coaches
Note: Statistics are correct through the end of the 2022 NFL regular season.

Notes
 A running total of the number of Oilers/Titans head coaches. Thus, any head coach who has two or more terms is only counted once.
 Each year is linked to an article about that particular Oilers/Titans season.

References

Tennessee Titans
 
 
Head coaches